Tennō Sekkan Daijin Eizukan (天皇摂関大臣影図巻) is a Japanese emakimono in three scrolls. It is in the holdings of the Archives and Mausolea Department of the Imperial Household Agency. It is also known as Tenshi Sekkan Miei (天子摂関御影). It dates to the late Kamakura period. It is a series of picture scrolls of portraits of emperors, regents and ministers of state arranged in roughly chronological order.

Content 
Tennō Sekkan Daijin Eizukan, also known as Tenshi Sekkan Miei, is an emakimono in three scrolls. It includes portraits of emperors, regents and ministers of state arranged in roughly chronological order.

Authorship and date 
Tennō Sekkan Daijin Eizukan is traditionally attributed to Fujiwara no Tamenobu (藤原為信) and Fujiwara no Gōshin (藤原豪信). It dates to the late Kamakura period.

Textual tradition 
It is in the holdings of the Archives and Mausolea Department of the Imperial Household Agency.

References

Citations

Works cited 

 

Emakimono
Kamakura-period works